KTSW (89.9 FM) is a radio station broadcasting an Alternative format. Licensed to San Marcos, Texas, United States, it serves the San Marcos, Kyle, and New Braunfels areas.  The station is an affiliate of Texas State University. Originally based in Old Main, KTSW 89.9 has moved into the newly renovated Trinity building in the fall of 2016. Its radio transmitter is located in New Braunfels on the Guadalupe County, Texas side.

External links
 
 
 

TSW
TSW
Radio stations established in 1983